Altyn is a historical currency of Russia.

Altyn may also refer to:

altın, (алтын) the word for gold in several Turkic languages
Altyn Kyran (Алтын Кыран Golden Eagle), an order of the Republic of Kazakhstan
Altyn-Köl (Golden Lake), a lake in the Altai Republic, Russia
Altan Orda, the Mongolian for Golden Horde
Altyn-Depe (Golden Hill), a site in Turkmenistan
Altyn-Tagh range, Northwestern China
Altyn Tolobas, a novel by Boris Akunin

See also
 Altin
 Altın